The New England Patriots season was the franchise's 15th season in the National Football League and 25th overall. The Patriots finished the season with a record of nine wins and seven losses, and finished second in the AFC East Division.

Head coach Ron Meyer, who had coached the Patriots for the previous two seasons, was fired halfway through the season. Meyer had angered several of his players with public criticism. After a 44–22 loss to Miami in Week 8, Meyer fired popular defensive coordinator Rod Rust; Meyer himself was fired by Patriots management shortly thereafter.

The Patriots went outside the organization to hire Raymond Berry, who had been New England's receivers coach from 1978 to 1981 under coaches Chuck Fairbanks and Ron Erhardt. Berry had been working in the private sector in Medfield, Massachusetts, when the Patriots called him to replace Meyer. Berry's first order of business was to immediately rehire Rust.

Under Berry's leadership, the Patriots won four of their last eight games. Berry's importance to the team was reflected less in his initial win–loss record than in the respect he immediately earned in the locker room – "Raymond Berry earned more respect in one day than Ron Meyer earned in three years," according to running back Tony Collins.

Staff

Roster

Regular season

Schedule

Season summary

Week 1 
Behind two Steve Grogan touchdown throws, the Patriots raced to a 21–0 lead. They withstood a second-half Bills comeback attempt, and won 21–17.

Week 2 (Sunday, September 9, 1984): at Miami Dolphins 

Point spread: Dolphins by 6
 Over/Under: 43.0 (under)
 Time of Game: 3 hours, 3 minutes

Grogan had a miserable day as he was intercepted four times; William Judson ran back one for a 60-yard touchdown. The Dolphins, led by two Dan Marino touchdown passes, won 28–7.

Week 3 
The first home game of the season ended Grogan's season as he failed to complete any of his four passes and Kenny Easley ran back his interception for a 25-yard touchdown. The Seahawks scored three touchdowns marred by a missed PAT. Tony Eason replaced Grogan with six minutes left in the first half and in the final minute ran in a 25-yard touchdown. From there three Patriots backs rushed for 189 yards and three touchdowns and Eason tossed scores to Derrick Ramsey and Irving Fryar while Dave Krieg of the Seahawks was bullied into two interceptions. The Patriots came back to win 38–23. The 23-point comeback was the largest in Patriots franchise history, a team record held until 2013.

Week 8 (Sunday, October 21, 1984): vs. Miami Dolphins 

Point spread: Dolphins by 4
 Over/Under: 42.0 (over)
 Time of Game: 3 hours, 13 minutes

Week 9 

 Source: Pro-Football-Reference.com
    
    
    
    
    
    
    
    
    
    

Raymond Berry's first game as Patriots' head coach.

Standings

References 

New England Patriots
New England Patriots seasons
New England Patriots
Sports competitions in Foxborough, Massachusetts